Vladimír Ráž (1 July 1923 – 4 July 2000) was a Czechoslovak film actor. He appeared in more than 60 films and television shows between 1947 and 2000. He is buried at the Vyšehrad Cemetery in Prague.

Selected filmography
 A Dead Man Among the Living (1949)
 The Trap (1950)
 The Proud Princess (1952)
 The Secret of Blood (1953)
 Dog's Heads (1955)
 Today for the Last Time (1958)
 První parta (1959)
 Všichni proti všem (1977)

References

External links
 

1923 births
2000 deaths
People from Nejdek
Czech male film actors
Czech male stage actors
Czech male television actors
Czech male voice actors
Czechoslovak male voice actors
20th-century Czech male actors
Burials at Vyšehrad Cemetery